Den of Geek is a US and UK-based website covering entertainment with a focus on pop culture. The website also issues a bi-annual magazine.

History
Den of Geek was founded in 2007 by Simon Brew in London. In 2012, DoG Tech LLC licensed Den of Geek for the North American markets, opening a New York City office. In 2017, Dennis Publishing entered into a joint venture agreement with DoG Tech, LLC.

In 2019, Dennis Publishing divested its share in Den of Geek World Limited to DoG Tech LLC.

Website
Den of Geek publishes entertainment news, reviews, interviews, and features. Den of Geek US is overseen by editor-in-chief Mike Cecchini, while the UK edition of the website is edited by Rosie Fletcher. Den of Geek also produces video content.

Publishing

Den of Geek debuted its print edition in October 2015 at New York Comic Con. The magazine is published twice annually and distributed locally at San Diego Comic-Con in July and New York Comic Con in October. The print edition is edited by Chris Longo. In 2017, the magazine was also launched in the UK.

In 2017, a Den of Geek-branded book, Movie Geek: The Den of Geek Guide to the Movieverse, was published. It was followed in 2019 by TV Geek: The Den of Geek Guide for the Netflix Generation.

References

External links
 

2007 establishments in England
American companies established in 2007
Mass media companies established in 2007
Mass media companies of the United States
Mass media companies based in New York City
American subsidiaries of foreign companies